Junction Knob is a descriptive name given by the New Zealand Antarctic Place-Names Committee to a small but distinctive peak at the junction of Odin Glacier and Alberich Glacier névé areas in the Asgard Range, Victoria Land, Antarctica.

References

Hills of Victoria Land
McMurdo Dry Valleys